Edgar Gonzalez may refer to:

 Édgar González (pitcher) (born 1983), Mexican baseball pitcher
 Édgar González (Mexican footballer) (born 1980), Mexican football striker
 Édgar González (footballer, born 1979), Paraguayan international football player
 Edgar Gonzalez (infielder) (born 1978), American baseball infielder
 Edgar González (footballer, born 1997), Spanish footballer
 Edgar Gonzalez Jr. (born 1996), member of the Illinois House of Representatives